Vladimir Aleksandrov (born February 7, 1958) is a Soviet bobsledder who competed in the early 1980s. He won the bronze medal in the two-man event at the 1984 Winter Olympics in Sarajevo.

References
 Bobsleigh two-man Olympic medalists 1932-56 and since 1964
 DatabaseOlympics.com profile

1958 births
Bobsledders at the 1984 Winter Olympics
Living people
Russian male bobsledders
Soviet male bobsledders
Olympic bobsledders of the Soviet Union
Olympic bronze medalists for the Soviet Union
Olympic medalists in bobsleigh
Medalists at the 1984 Winter Olympics